Walkman, stylised as , is a brand of portable audio players manufactured and marketed by Japanese technology company Sony since 1979. The original Walkman was a portable cassette player and its popularity made "walkman" an unofficial term for personal stereos of any producer or brand. By 2010, when production stopped, Sony had built about 200 million cassette-based Walkmans.

The Walkman brand was extended to serve most of Sony's portable audio devices, including DAT players, MiniDisc players/recorders, CD players (originally Discman then renamed the CD Walkman), transistor radios, mobile phones, and digital audio/media players. As of 2011, the Walkman range consists exclusively of digital players.

Development 

The Compact Cassette was developed in 1963 by the Dutch electronics firm Philips. In the late 1960s, the introduction of prerecorded compact cassettes made it possible to listen to music on portable devices as well as on car stereos, though gramophone records remained the most popular format for home listening.

Portable tape players of various designs were available, but none of them were intended to be operated by a person as they were walking. In the 1970s, Brazilian inventor Andreas Pavel devised a method for carrying a player of this type on a belt around the waist, listening via headphones, but his "Stereobelt" concept did not include the required engineering advancements to yield high-quality sound reproduction while the tape player was subject to mechanical shock as would be expected on a person walking. Pavel later lost his suit claiming the Walkman idea as his own.

Sony cofounder Masaru Ibuka used Sony's bulky TC-D5 cassette recorder to listen to music while traveling for business. He asked executive deputy president Norio Ohga to design a playback-only stereo version optimized for walking. The metal-cased blue-and-silver Walkman TPS-L2, the world's first low-cost personal stereo, went on sale in Japan on July 1, 1979, and was sold for around ¥33,000 (or $150.00). Though Sony predicted it would sell about 5,000 units a month, it sold more than 30,000 in the first two months.

The Walkman was followed by a series of international releases; as overseas sales companies objected to the  wasei-eigo name, it was sold under several names, including Sound-about in the United States, Freestyle in Australia and Sweden, and Stowaway in the UK. Eventually, in the early 1980s, Walkman caught on globally and Sony used the name worldwide. The TPS-L2 was introduced in the US in June 1980.

The 1980s was the decade of the intensive development of the Walkman lineup. In 1981 Sony released the second Walkman model, the WM-2, which was significantly smaller compared to the TPS-L2 thanks to "inverse" mounting of the power-operated magnetic head and soft-touch buttons. Sony applied the "Walkman" brand to some transistor radios starting with the matching blue SRF-40 FM Walkman in 1980, and added a radio to some Walkman cassette models starting with the model WM-F1 in 1982. The first model with Dolby noise-reduction system appeared in 1982.
The first ultra-compact "cassette-size" Walkman was introduced in 1983, model WM-20, with a telescopic case. This allowed even easier carrying of a Walkman in bags or pockets. The first model with autoreverse was released in 1984.

In October 1985, the WM-101 model was the first in its class with a "gum stick" rechargeable battery. In 1986 Sony presented the first model outfitted with remote control, as well as one with a solar battery (WM-F107).

Within a decade of launch, Sony held a 50% market share in the United States and 46% in Japan.

Two limited edition 10th anniversary models were released in 1989 (WM-701S/T) in Japan, made of brass and plated in sterling silver. Only a few hundred were built of each. A 15th anniversary model was also made on July 1, 1994, with vertical loading, and a 20th anniversary on July 1, 1999, with a prestige model.

By 1989, 10 years after the launch of the first model, over  Walkmans had been sold worldwide.  units were manufactured by 1995. By 1999, 20 years after the introduction of the first model, Sony sold 186 million cassette Walkmans.

Portable compact disc players led to the decline of the cassette Walkman, which was discontinued in Japan in 2010. The last cassette-based model available in the US was the WM-FX290W, which was first released in 2004.

Marketing 

The marketing of the Walkman helped introduce the idea of "Japanese-ness" into global culture, synonymous with miniaturization and high-technology. The "Walk-men" and "Walk-women" in advertisements were created to be the ideal reflections of the viewing audience. Sony implemented a marketing strategy, hiring young adults to walk around in public wearing a Walkman, offering nearby people to test out the product. Sony also hired actors to pose with the Walkman around the streets of Tokyo as an additional form of promotion.

A major component of the Walkman advertising campaign was overspecialization of the device. Prior to the Walkman, the common device for portable music was the portable radio, which could only offer listeners standard music broadcasts. Having the ability to customize a playlist was a new and exciting revolution in music consumption. Potential buyers had the opportunity to choose their perfect match in terms of mobile listening technology. The ability to play one's personal choice of music and listen privately was a huge selling point of the Walkman, especially amongst teens, who greatly contributed to its success. A diversity of features and styles suggested that there would be a product which was "the perfect choice" for each consumer. This method of marketing to an extremely expansive user-base while maintaining the idea that the product was made for each individual "[got] the best of all possible worlds—mass marketing and personal differentiation".

Impact and legacy 

Culturally the Walkman had a great effect and it became ubiquitous. According to Time, the Walkman's "unprecedented combination of portability (it ran on two AA batteries) and privacy (it featured a headphone jack but no external speaker) made it the ideal product for thousands of consumers looking for a compact portable stereo that they could take with them anywhere". According to The Verge, "the world changed" on the day the Walkman was released.

The Walkman became an icon in 1980s culture. In 1986, the word "Walkman" entered the Oxford English Dictionary. Millions used the Walkman during exercise, marking the beginning of the aerobics fad. Between 1987 and 1997, the height of the Walkman's popularity, the number of people who said they walked for exercise increased by 30%. Other firms, including Aiwa, Panasonic and Toshiba, produced similar products, and in 1983 cassettes outsold vinyl for the first time.

The Walkman has been cited to not only change people's relationship to music but also technology, due to its "solitary" and "personal" nature, as users were listening to their own music of choice rather than through a radio. It has been seen as a precursor of personal mainstream tech possessions such as personal computers or mobile phones. Headphones also started to be worn in public. This caused safety controversies in the US, which in 1982 led to the mayor of Woodbridge, New Jersey banning Walkman to be worn in public due to pedestrian accidents.

In the market, the Walkman's success also led to great adoption of the Compact Cassette format. Within a few years, cassettes were outselling vinyl records, and would continue to do so until the compact disc (CD) overtook cassette sales in 1991.

In German-speaking countries, the use of "Walkman" became generic, meaning a personal stereo of any make, to a degree that the Austrian Supreme Court of Justice ruled in 2002 that Sony could not prevent others from using the term "Walkman" to describe similar goods. It is therefore an example of what marketing experts call the "genericide" of a brand.

A large statue of a Sports Walkman FM was erected in Tokyo's Ginza district in 2019 in celebration of the 40th anniversary.

Other Walkman

In 1989, Sony released portable Video8 recorders marketed as Video Walkman, extending the brand name. In 1990 Sony released portable Digital Audio Tape (DAT) players marketed as DAT Walkman. It was extended further in 1992 for MiniDisc players with the MD Walkman brand. From 1997, Sony's Discman range of portable compact disc (CD) players started to rebrand as CD Walkman. In 2000, the Walkman brand (the entire range) was unified, and a new small icon, "W.", was made for the branding.

Digital players (1999–present)
On December 21, 1999, Sony launched its first digital audio players (DAP), under the name Network Walkman (alongside players developed by the VAIO division). The first player, which used Memory Stick storage medium, was branded as MS Walkman, shortly before the Walkman brand unification. Most future models would use built-in solid-state flash memory, although hard disk based players were also released from 2004 to 2007. They came with OpenMG copyright protection and, until 2004, exclusively supported Sony's in-house ATRAC format; there was no support for industry-standard MP3 as Sony wanted to protect its records division, Sony BMG, from piracy. Additionally, Walkman-branded mobile phones were also made by the Sony Ericsson joint venture.

Sony could not, however, repeat the success of the cassette player in the 21st century digital audio player (DAP) market. Rival Apple's iPod range became a large success in the market, hindering Walkman sales internationally, though it fared better domestically. The Network Walkman for several years had paltry market share and had also been struggling against numerous other rivals such as Creative, Rio, Mpio and iRiver, although sales and share did eventually increase fivefold in 2005 and continued improving, but still remained small. Its pricing policy, SonicStage software and lack of MP3 support in earlier years have been suggested factors of its performance. Its U.S. market share in 2006 was 1.9%, placing it behind Apple, SanDisk, Creative and Samsung. In Japan its share in 2009–2010 was between 43 and 48%, slightly ahead of Apple.

Meanwhile, Sony Computer Entertainment, a Sony division who are not involved in Walkman products, officially described their PlayStation Portable in 2004 as the "21st century Walkman".

Current range

Walkman portable digital audio and media players are the only Walkman-branded products still being produced today – although the "Network" prefix is no longer being used, the model numbers still carry the "NW-" prefix. The current product range as of 2022 are:
A Series – flagship mid-range players
B Series (except Japan) – budget-oriented thumb style music players
E Series – entry level players
S Series (Japan) – entry level players
W/WS Series – wearable music players
WM1 Series – flagship luxurious high-end players (part of Sony's Signature Series of audio products)
ZX Series – high-end music players

Since 2017, Sony also provide the Music Center for PC software on Microsoft Windows, designed for both content transfer and playback for Walkman and other audio products.

See also 
 Walkman effect
 Stereobelt
 List of Sony Walkman products
 Sony Watchman
 Discman
 PlayStation Portable

Notes

References

External links 

Official Sony website

 
Products introduced in 1979
1980s fads and trends
1990s fads and trends
Products and services discontinued in 2010
Consumer electronics brands
Audio players
Japanese inventions
Portable media players
Sony Ericsson mobile phones
Sony products
Models of radios